The canton of Le Pontet is an administrative division of the Vaucluse department, in southeastern France. It was created at the French canton reorganisation which came into effect in March 2015. Its seat is in Le Pontet.

It consists of the following communes: 
Jonquerettes 
Le Pontet
Saint-Saturnin-lès-Avignon
Vedène
Velleron

References

Cantons of Vaucluse